The 2022 Portland Thorns FC season is the team's tenth season as a professional women's soccer team. Thorns FC plays in the National Women's Soccer League, the top tier of women's soccer in the United States.

Background 

In the wake of the 2021 NWSL abuse scandal, Thorns FC placed general manager Gavin Wilkinson on administrative leave from his role with the Thorns, but retained him as the president and general manager of the co-owned Portland Timbers. The team hired retired Thorns FC goalkeeper and Canadian international Karina LeBlanc as Gavin Wilkinson's replacement on November 2, 2021.

Following the exit of head coach Mark Parsons to manage the Netherlands women's national football team, Thorns FC hired another of the club's former players during Riley's tenure, Rhian Wilkinson, as his replacement. Wilkinson had also played on the Canadian national team as a teammate of LeBlanc and longtime Thorns FC and Canadian team captain Christine Sinclair. After her playing career, Wilkinson had been an assistant coach for the Canadian and English national teams.

Stadium and facilities 
Thorns FC continued to play and train in Providence Park, their home since the team's inaugural season in 2013. The team held its preseason training camp in Bend, Oregon.

Broadcasting 
On May 4, 2022, KPTV agreed to broadcast seven regular season Thorns FC matches locally via FOX 12 PLUS. These matches were in addition to the league's national agreements with CBS, Paramount+, and Twitch.

Team

Staff

Squad

Competitions

NWSL Challenge Cup 

Portland entered 2022 as the defending NWSL Challenge Cup champions. In 2022, the Thorns competed in the cup's West Division during the group stage.

Group stage

West Division standings

2022 Women's International Champions Cup

Regular season 

Portland entered 2022 as the defending NWSL Shield champions of the 2021 National Women's Soccer League season.

Matches

Regular season standings

Results summary

Results by matchday

Awards

NWSL monthly awards

Player of the Month

Rookie of the Month

NWSL weekly awards

Player of the Week

Save of the Week

Transactions

2022 NWSL Expansion Draft 

The 2022 NWSL Expansion Draft was an expansion draft held by the NWSL on December 16, 2021, for two expansion teams, Angel City FC and San Diego Wave FC, to select players from existing teams in the league.

On December 8, 2021, the Thorns traded Simone Charley and Tyler Lussi to Angel City FC in exchange for $100,000 in allocation money, a 2022 NWSL Draft natural second-round pick, and immunity from Angel City in the expansion draft.

The Thorns protected nine players, and San Diego selected none of the unprotected players. On the day of the draft, the Thorns traded Christen Westphal and Amirah Ali to San Diego Wave FC in exchange for $50,000 in allocation money, but the Thorns did not officially acquire draft immunity from San Diego.

2022 NWSL Draft 

Draft picks are not automatically signed to the team roster. The 2022 NWSL Draft was held on December 18, 2021.

Transfers in

Transfers out

References 

2022 National Women's Soccer League season
American soccer clubs 2022 season
Portland Thorns FC
Portland Thorns FC seasons
2022 in sports in Oregon